Cytochrome c1, heme protein, mitochondrial (CYC1), also known as UQCR4, MC3DN6, Complex III subunit 4, Cytochrome b-c1 complex subunit 4, or Ubiquinol-cytochrome-c reductase complex cytochrome c1 subunit is a protein that in humans is encoded by the CYC1 gene. CYC1 is a respiratory subunit of Ubiquinol Cytochrome c Reductase (complex III), which is located in the inner mitochondrial membrane and is part of the electron transport chain. Mutations in this gene may cause mitochondrial complex III deficiency, nuclear, type 6.

Structure 
CYC1 is located on the q arm of chromosome 8 in position 24.3 and has 8 exons. The CYC1 gene produces a 13.5 kDa protein composed of 130 amino acids. CYC1 belongs to the cytochrome c family. CYC1 is a phosphoprotein and subunit of Ubiquinol Cytochrome c Reductase that binds heme groups. It has helix, transit peptide, and transmembrane domains and contains 9 alpha helixes, 5 beta strands, and 3 turns. The transmembrane protein passes through the inner mitochondrial membrane once and the majority of the protein is found on the intermembrane side. CYC1 contains covalent heme bindings sites at positions 121 and 124 and heme axial ligand iron-metal binding sites at positions 125 and 244.

Function 
CYC1 encodes a protein that is located in the inner mitochondrial membrane and is part of Ubiquinol Cytochrome c Reductase (complex III). The encoded protein, CYC1, is a respiratory subunit of the cytochrome bc1 complex, which plays an important role in the mitochondrial respiratory chain by transferring electrons from the Rieske iron-sulfur protein to cytochrome c.

Species 
CYC1 is a human gene that is conserved in chimpanzee, Rhesus monkey, dog, cow, mouse, rat, zebrafish, fruit fly, mosquito, C. elegans, S. cerevisiae, K. lactis, E. gossypii, S. pombe, N. crassa, A. thaliana, rice, and frog. There are orthologs of CYC1 in 137 known organisms.

Clinical Significance 
Variants of CYC1 have been associated with mitochondrial complex III deficiency, nuclear, type 6. Mitochondrial complex III deficiency, nuclear, type 6 is an autosomal recessive disorder of the mitochondrial respiratory chain resulting from a defect in Ubiquinol Cytochrome c Reductase (complex III) that leads to reduced complex III activity. Clinical features tend to emerge in early childhood and include episodic acute lactic acidosis, ketoacidosis, insulin-responsive hyperglycemia, liver dysfunction, encephalopathy, and associated infection, although psychomotor development may remain normal. Pathogenic mutations have included c.288G>T, p.Trp96Cys and c.643C>T p. Leu215Phe.

Interactions 
CYC1 has 78 protein-protein interactions with 72 of them being co-complex interactions. CYC1 is one of 11 subunits of Ubiquinol Cytochrome c Reductase (b1-c complex) that includes the respiratory subunits cytochrome b, cytochrome c1 (CYC1), UQCRFS1, the core proteins UQCRC1 and UQCRC2, and the low-molecular weight proteins UQCRH, UQCRB, UQCRQ, UQCR10, UQCR11, as well as an additional cleavage product of UQCRFS1. Additionally, CCP1, CDKA-1, and CDKB1-1 have also been found to interact with CYC1.

References

External links

Further reading 

 
 
 
 
 
 
 
 
 
 
 
 
 
 
 
 
 
 
 

Human proteins